The Thirteen Treasures of the Island of Britain (Welsh: Tri Thlws ar Ddeg Ynys Prydain) are a series of items in late-medieval Welsh tradition. Lists of the items appear in texts dating to the 15th and 16th centuries. The number of treasures is always given as thirteen, but some later versions list different items, replacing or combining entries to maintain the number.

List

The various treasures (tlws) include vessels or utensils for food and drink (hamper, cauldron, crock and dish, horn and knife), objects relating to weaponry (sword, whetstone) and to transport (halter, chariot), clothing (coat, mantle) and still other items (stone and ring, chessboard). Most of the items are placed in the Hen Ogledd or "Old North", the Brittonic-speaking parts of what is now southern Scotland and Northern England; some early manuscripts refer to the whole list specifically as treasures "that were in the North". 

The number of treasures is always given as thirteen, but some later versions list different items, replacing or combining entries to maintain the number. Later versions also supplement the plain list with explanatory comments about each treasure. The standard version of the list includes the following treasures:

 White-Hilt, the Sword of Rhydderch Hael (Dyrnwyn, gleddyf Rhydderch Hael): "if a well-born man drew it himself, it burst into flame from its hilt to its tip. And everyone who used to ask for it would receive; but because of this peculiarity everyone used to reject it. And therefore he was called Rhydderch the Generous."
 The Hamper of Gwyddno Garanhir (Mwys Gwyddno Garanir): food for one man would be put in it, and when it was opened, food for a hundred men would be found in it.
 The Horn of Brân Galed from the North (Corn Brân Galed o'r Gogledd): whatever drink might be wished for was found in it.
 The Chariot of Morgan Mwynfawr (Car Morgan Mwynfawr): if a man went in it, he might wish to be wherever he would, and he would be there quickly.
 The Halter of Clydno Eiddyn (Cebystr Clydno Eiddin), which was fixed to a staple at the foot of his bed: whatever horse he might wish for, he would find in the halter.
 The Knife of Llawfrodedd Farchog (Cyllell Llawfrodedd Farchog), which would serve for twenty-four men to eat at table.
 The Cauldron of Dyrnwch the Giant (Pair Dyrnwch Gawr): if meat for a coward were put in it to boil, it would never boil; but if meat for a brave man were put in it, it would boil quickly (and thus the brave could be distinguished from the cowardly).
 The Whetstone of Tudwal Tudglyd (Hogalen Tudwal Tudclyd): if a brave man sharpened his sword on the whetstone, then the sword would certainly kill any man from whom it drew blood. If a cowardly man used the whetstone, though, his sword would refuse to draw blood at all.
 The Coat of Padarn Beisrudd (Pais Badarn Beisrydd): if a well-born man put it on, it would be the right size for him; if a churl, it would not go upon him.
 The Crock and the Dish of Rhygenydd the Cleric (Gren a desgyl Rhygenydd Ysgolhaig): whatever food might be wished for in them, it would be found.
 The Chessboard of Gwenddoleu ap Ceidio (Gwyddbwyll Gwenddoleu ap Ceidio): if the pieces were set, they would play by themselves. The board was of gold, and the men of silver.
 The Mantle of Arthur in Cornwall (Llen Arthyr yng Nghernyw): whoever was under it could not be seen, and he could see everyone.
 The Mantle of Tegau Gold-Breast (Tegau Eurfron, wife of Caradoc): Her mantle would not serve for any woman who had violated her marriage or her virginity. It would reach to the ground when worn by a faithful woman but would only hang down to the lap of an unfaithful wife.

Later lists also include two additional treasures, the Mantle of Tegau Eurfon, and Eluned's Stone and Ring. Where these appear, one of the other treasures is dropped and the Crock and the Dish of Rhygenydd the Cleric are counted as one item. The new items come from literary, rather than traditional, material; the Mantle comes from a version of the Caradoc story, while Eluned's stone and ring come from the prose tale Owain, or the Lady of the Fountain.

Description

Some of the magical objects listed can be shown to have earlier origins in Welsh narrative tradition. Items 1, 2 and 7, for instance, are also described in the Middle Welsh tale Culhwch ac Olwen (tentatively dated to c. 1100), in which Ysbaddaden the Giant gives King Arthur's cousin Culhwch a list of impossible tasks (anoetheu) which he has to complete in order to win the hand of Olwen, the giant's daughter.

Dyrnwyn, the Sword of Rhydderch Hael
The Dyrnwyn ("White-Hilt") is said to be a powerful sword belonging to Rhydderch Hael, one of the Three Generous Men of Britain mentioned in the Welsh Triads. When drawn by a worthy or well-born man, the entire blade would blaze with fire. Rhydderch was never reluctant to hand the weapon to anyone, hence his nickname Hael meaning "the Generous", but the recipients, as soon as they had learned of its peculiar properties, always rejected the sword.

The Hamper of Gwyddno Garanhir
It is told that Gwyddno Garanhir ("Long-shank") possessed a hamper (mwys) which would multiply food: if one was to put food for one man in the basket and open it again, the food was found to be increased a hundredfold.

The Horn of Brân Galed
The Horn of Brân Galed ("the Stingy" or "the Niggard") from the North is said to have possessed the magical property of ensuring that "whatever drink might be wished for was found in it". Marginal notes to the text in Peniarth MS 147 (c. 1566) elaborate on this brief entry by saying that Myrddin had approached the kings and lords of Britain to request their treasures. They consented on the condition that he obtained the horn of Brân Galed, supposing that the task would be impossible to fulfill (whether owing to Brân's reputation for being close-fisted or for some other reason). However, Myrddin somehow succeeded in obtaining the drinking horn and so received the other treasures as well. He took his hoard to the "Glass House" (Tŷ Gwydr), where it would remain forever. Tracing the prehistory of the horn to the Greek mythological past, the same notes tell that Hercules had removed the horn from the head of the centaur he had slain, whose wife then killed the hero in bloody revenge.

The discrepancy between Brân's nickname ("the Stingy") and the special property of the enchanted horn appears to be explained by the Welsh poet Guto'r Glyn, who lived in the mid-15th century and was therefore contemporary with the earliest attestations of the Tri Thlws ar Ddeg. He relates that Brân Galed was a northern nobleman, whom Taliesin transformed into a man superior to the Tri Hael, i.e. the three most generous men in Britain according to one of the Welsh Triads. Later bards to allude to the treasure include Tudur Aled and Iorwerth Fynglwyd.

The identity of Brân Galed (not to be confused with Brân the Blessed) is uncertain. His northern background, which is usually described in general terms, is specified in one place elsewhere. A 16th-century note written by the scribe Gruffudd Hiraethog (died 1564) identifies Brân as the son of one Emellyr, which appears to refer to the Brân son of Ymellyrn who is depicted in the Llywarch Hen cycle of poems as an opponent of the kings of Rheged. The latter has also been equated with the Brân fighting at Cynwyd (northern Wales) in the poem Gwarchan Tudfwlch, possibly against Owain of Rheged.

The Chariot of Morgan Mwynfawr
The chariot belonging to Morgan Mwynfawr ("the Wealthy") is described as a magical vehicle which would quickly reach whatever destination one might wish to go to.

The Halter of Clydno Eiddyn

Belonged to Clydno Eiddyn (Cebystr Clydno Eiddin). It was fixed to a staple at the foot of his bed. Whatever horse he might wish for, he would find in the halter. The Halter of Clydno Eiddyn was also called The Handy Halter, for it summons fine horses.

The Knife of Llawfrodedd the Horseman
Llawfrodedd Farchog (from marchog "the Horseman"), or Barfawc "the Bearded" in other manuscripts, is said to have owned a knife which would serve for a company of 24 men at the dinner table.

The Cauldron of Dyrnwch the Giant
The cauldron (pair) of Dyrnwch the Giant is said to discriminate between cowards and brave men: whereas it would not boil meat for a coward, it would boil quickly if that meat belonged to a brave man. The description probably goes back to a story similar to that found in the Middle Welsh tale Culhwch ac Olwen, in which the cauldron of Diwrnach the Irishman, steward (maer) to Odgar son of Aedd, King of Ireland, is among the anoetheu which Culhwch is required to obtain for the wedding banquet. King Arthur requests the cauldron from King Odgar, but Diwrnach refuses to give up his prized possession. Arthur goes to visit Diwrnach in Ireland, accompanied by a small party, and is received at his house, but when Diwrnach refuses to answer Arthur's request a second time, Bedwyr (Arthur's champion) seizes the cauldron and entrusts it to one of Arthur's servants, who is to carry the load on his back. In a single sweep with the sword called Caledfwlch, Llenlleawg the Irishman kills off Diwrnach and all his men. A confrontation with Irish forces ensues, but Arthur and his men fight them off. They board their ship Prydwen and, taking with them the cauldron loaded with the spoils of war, return to Britain.

In Culhwch, Diwrnach's cauldron is not attributed with any special power. However, the earlier poem Preiddeu Annwfn (The Spoils of Annwfn), refers to an adventure by Arthur and his men to obtain a cauldron with magical properties equivalent to the one in the lists of the thirteen treasures. In this poem the owner of the cauldron is not an Irish lord but the king of Annwn, the Welsh Otherworld, suggesting that the version of the story in Culhwch is a later attempt to euhemerize an older tale.

Diwrnach's name, which derives from Irish Diugurach and exhibits no literary provenance, may have been selected by the author of Culhwch ac Olwen to emphasize the Irish setting of his story. Although Dyrnwch is not himself described as an Irishman, it is probable that his name goes back to Diwrnach. The extant manuscripts of Tri Thlws ar Ddeg also present such variant spellings as Dyrnog and Tyrnog, without the Irish-sounding ending, but on balance, these are best explained as Welsh approximations of a foreign name.

The Whetstone of Tudwal Tudglyd
Sharpens the blade of a fine warrior. It shall draw blood from any enemy of its user if its user be brave; if its user shall be cowardly, then the blade shall not be sharpened and draw no blood whatsoever.

The Coat of Padarn Beisrudd
Padarn's coat perfectly fits any brave man; will not fit cowards.

The Crock and Dish of Rhygenydd Ysgolhaig
Belonged to Rhygenydd the Cleric. Whatever food might be wished for in them, it would be found on them.

Chessboard of Gwenddoleu ap Ceidio 
Rather large chess board with pieces of silver and crystal and the board made of gold. The pieces only play by themselves if all the pieces are set up correctly.

The Mantle of Arthur in Cornwall
King Arthur's llen or mantle is said to make anyone underneath it invisible, though able to see out. This item is known from two other sources, the prose tales Culhwch and Olwen (c. 1100) and The Dream of Rhonabwy (early 13th century). A very similar mantle also appears in the Second Branch of the Mabinogi, in which it is used by Caswallawn to assassinate the seven stewards left behind by Brân the Blessed and usurp the throne.

In Culhwch Arthur's mantle is included in the list of the only things Arthur will not give to the protagonist Culhwch, but it is not named specifically or otherwise described. However, the names of several of the other items contain the element gwyn, meaning "white; sacred; blessed", suggesting otherworldly connections for the whole list. In The Dream of Rhonabwy, the mantle is specifically named Gwenn, and has properties analogous to those given in the lists of the Thirteen Treasures, though here it is those on top of the mantle who are made invisible.

The Mantle of Tegau Gold-Breast
Tegau Gold-Breast (Tegau Eurfron, wife of Caradoc) was a Welsh heroine. Her mantle would not serve for any woman who had violated her marriage or her virginity. It would reach to the ground when worn by a faithful woman but would only hang down to the lap of an unfaithful wife.

The Stone and Ring of Eluned the Fortunate
One might describe it as a ring of invisibility. It's said that Merlin once possessed this item for a while.

See also
 Four Treasures, The four hallows of Ireland
 The Chronicles of Prydain, which includes Dyrnwyn as part of its mythos.

References

Bibliography

Primary sources
Tri Thlws ar Ddeg Ynys Prydain, ed. and tr. Rachel Bromwich, Trioedd Ynys Prydein. Cardiff: University of Wales Press, 1978; revised ed. 1991 (Critical edition of the trioedd texts with notes, first published in 1961). Appendix III. Edited from Cardiff MS. 17, pp. 95–6, and other variants.
Culhwhc ac Olwen, ed. Rachel Bromwich and D. Simon Evans, Culhwch and Olwen: An Edition and Study of the Oldest Arthurian Tale. University of Wales Press, 1992; tr. Jones and Jones, The Mabinogion.
Trioedd Ynys Prydein. trans. and ed. by Rachel Bromwich. Cardiff: UWP, 1961.

Secondary sources
Carey, John. Ireland and the Grail. Aberystwyth: Celtic Studies Publications, 2007.
Gantz, Jeffrey (translator) (1987). The Mabinogion. New York: Penguin. .
Green, Thomas (2007). Concepts of Arthur. Stroud, Gloucestershire: Tempus. .
Jones, Mary. "Tri Thlws ar Ddeg Ynys Prydain". From maryjones.us. Retrieved June 16, 2009.
Jones, Mary. "The Horn of Bran". From maryjones.us. Retrieved June 17, 2009.
Sims-Williams, Patrick. "The Significance of the Irish Personal Names in Culhwch and Olwen." Bulletin of the Board of Celtic Studies 29 (1982): 607-10.

Further reading
Bartrum, Peter C. "Tri Thlws ar Ddeg Ynys Prydein." Études Celtiques 10 (1963). 434-77.
Rowlands, Eurys I. "Y Tri Thlws ar Ddeg." Llên Cymru 5 (1958/9): 33–69, 145–7.

Arthurian legend
Wales-related lists
Medieval Welsh literature
Mythological objects
Welsh mythology
Hen Ogledd
Legendary treasures